Namul refers to either a variety of edible grass or leaves or seasoned herbal dishes made of them. Wild greens are called san-namul ("mountain namul"), and spring vegetables are called bom-namul ("spring namul"). On the day of Daeboreum, the first full moon of the year, Koreans eat boreum-namul ("full moon namul") with five-grain rice. It is believed that boreum namuls eaten in winter help one to withstand the heat of the summer to come.

Preparation and serving 

For namul as a dish, virtually any type of vegetable, herb, or green can be used, and the ingredient includes roots, leaves, stems, seeds, sprouts, petals, and fruits. Some seaweeds and mushrooms, and even animal products such as beef tendons are also made into namuls. Although in most cases the vegetables (and non-vegetable namul ingredients) are blanched before being seasoned, the method of preparation can also vary; they may be served fresh (raw), boiled, fried, sautéed, fermented, dried, or steamed. Namul can be seasoned with salt, vinegar, sesame oil and perilla oil, regular soy sauce and soup soy sauce, doenjang (soybean paste), gochujang, and many other spices and condiments.

Namul are typically served as banchan (반찬, a side dish accompanying the staples, usually bap). It is possible to have more than one type of namul served as a banchan at a single meal. Each namul dish may named depending on the main ingredients and the methods of preparation. For example, a seasoned chamnamul dish is most likely called chamnamulmuchim (literally "seasoned chamnamul"), since the name of the vegetable already contains the word "namul" in it. A namul dish made of raw radish is called musaengchae ("무생채, seasoned raw radish"), since it is usually the namul dish made with cooked radish that is called munamul ("radish namul").

Main ingredients of namul

Vegetables

Seaweeds

Mushrooms

Others

Gallery

See also 
 Sansai
 Saag

References

External links

Life in Korea: Korean seasoned vegetables

 
Korean cuisine